Gauldwell Castle was a 13th-century castle, about  north-west of Dufftown, Moray, Scotland, north of the River Fiddich.
Alternative names are Boharm Castle, Cauddwell Castle, Gallvall Castle and Goldwell Castle.

History
Freskin, a Flemish nobleman, progenitor of the Murrays of Abercairny held the Castle.  It became a property of the Earls of Moray.  In 1562 Mary, Queen of Scots stayed at the castle.
An earlier castle may have stood on the site.

Structure
Gauldwell Castle was a large enclosure castle.  There was a wall enclosing a courtyard, with a hall alteration and extensions took place during the period of its use.
The castle was built at the south of a ridge which sloped steeply to the east and west, though gently to the south.
The area of the probable courtyard is to the east.

See also
Castles in Great Britain and Ireland
List of castles in Scotland

References

Castles in Moray
De Moravia family
Clan Murray